Maurice Ballerstedt (born 16 January 2001) is a German professional racing cyclist, who currently rides for UCI ProTeam .

Major results

2018
 3rd Overall Internationale Cottbuser Junioren-Etappenfahrt
2019
 1st GP Luxembourg
 UEC European Junior Road Championships
2nd  Time trial
9th Road race
 2nd Overall Course de la Paix Juniors
 3rd Overall LVM Saarland Trofeo
1st Stage 3b (TTT)
 3rd GP Général Patton
 10th Gent–Wevelgem Juniors
2020
 8th Overall Orlen Nations Grand Prix
2021
 1st  Overall Tour du Pays de Montbéliard
1st  Young rider classification
1st Stage 3
 1st Stage 1 (TTT) Kreiz Breizh Elites
 National Under–23 Road Championships
2nd Time trial
5th Road race
 8th Egmont Cycling Race
 10th Time trial, UEC European Under–23 Road Championships

References

External links

2001 births
Living people
German male cyclists
Cyclists from Berlin
21st-century German people